Dr. Isaac Van Alphen  was Postmaster General during the Transvaal Second Republic, appointed on April 1, 1885.

See also
Friederich Jeppe
Postage stamps and postal history of Transvaal

References

External links

https://www.nytimes.com/1897/06/03/archives/kruegers-namesake-dead-transvaals-postmaster-general-learns-of-his.html

Year of birth missing
Year of death missing
Postmasters